32nd National Society of Film Critics Awards
January 3, 1998

Best Picture:
 L.A. Confidential 
The 32nd National Society of Film Critics Awards, given on 3 January 1998, honored the best filmmaking of 1997.

Winners

Best Picture 
1. L.A. Confidential
2. The Sweet Hereafter
3. Boogie Nights

Best Director 
1. Curtis Hanson – L.A. Confidential
2. Atom Egoyan – The Sweet Hereafter
3. Paul Thomas Anderson – Boogie Nights

Best Actor 
1. Robert Duvall – The Apostle
2. Peter Fonda – Ulee's Gold
3. Dustin Hoffman – Wag the Dog
3. Ian Holm – The Sweet Hereafter
3. Al Pacino – Donnie Brasco

Best Actress 
1. Julie Christie – Afterglow
2. Helena Bonham Carter – The Wings of the Dove
3. Judi Dench – Mrs. Brown

Best Supporting Actor 
1. Burt Reynolds – Boogie Nights
2. Kevin Spacey – L.A. Confidential
3. Rupert Everett – My Best Friend's Wedding

Best Supporting Actress 
1. Julianne Moore – Boogie Nights
2. Sarah Polley – The Sweet Hereafter
3. Nathalie Richard – Irma Vep

Best Screenplay 
1. Curtis Hanson and Brian Helgeland – L.A. Confidential
2. Atom Egoyan – The Sweet Hereafter
3. Kevin Smith – Chasing Amy

Best Cinematography 
1. Roger Deakins – Kundun
2. Dante Spinotti – L.A. Confidential
3. Christopher Doyle – Happy Together

Best Foreign Language Film 
1. La Promesse
2. Underground
3. Gabbeh

Best Non-Fiction Film 
1. Fast, Cheap & Out of Control
2. 4 Little Girls
3. Sick: The Life & Death of Bob Flanagan, Supermasochist

Special Citation 
Charles Burnett's Nightjohn, a film whose exceptional quality and origin challenge strictures of the movie marketplace.

References

External links
Past Awards

1997
1997 film awards
1998 in American cinema